"Ma'Gyptian" (Magician Remix) is a song by Nigerian rapper Ice Prince. It features vocals from Jamaican reggae singer Gyptian. Released on 4 March 2012, the song first appeared on Ice Prince's debut studio album, Everybody Loves Ice Prince (2011). It was produced by Jesse Jagz and released under Chocolate City.

Background and recording
In an interview with Adeola Adeyemo, Ice Prince was asked about his collaboration with Gyptian. His response was: "The collaboration was put together by a company called Spinlet, an online music store. I have a song on my album that has a Jamaican Reggae feel so they thought it would be nice to have a Jamaican artiste jump on the remix. And Gyptian is one person that I'm a big fan of and he came to Nigeria to do a show at Calabar Carnival. So we kidnapped him, brought him into the studio, recorded the song and shot the video on the same day. The studio that we used was an all round studio, it had a music studio and a visual part so as we were recording the song, Clarence was in the visual part setting up and when we were done, we just came there and shot the video."

BBC Radio 1Xtra airplay
In an interview with Tim Westwood at BBC Radio 1Xtra studio, Ice Prince introduced the song to Radio 1Xtra listeners.

Music video
The music video for the song was directed by Clarence Peters in Lagos. It was released on 20 March 2012, several days after the audio release.

Track listing
 Digital single

References

2011 songs
2012 singles
Ice Prince songs
Gyptian songs
Song recordings produced by Jesse Jagz